Westfield West Lakes is a shopping centre located in West Lakes, South Australia. It contains approximately 260 stores, with anchor tenants David Jones, Harris Scarfe, Kmart, Coles, Target, Woolworths and JB Hi-Fi.

Construction and opening 
The shopping centre was designed in 1973 by architects Dick-Smith Associates in association with Snowden Brougham and Moulds.  Construction commenced later in the year with the first stage being completed in late 1974 with the second stage of work being completed in 1975.  It was opened on 13 November 1974 by Don Dunstan, the Premier of South Australia.

Ownership
The shopping centre was originally owned by West Lakes Ltd, a subsidiary of the Development Finance Corporation Ltd (known as Delfin) and T & G Mutual Life Society.  In 1987, Delfin sold its 25% share to its partner now owned by National Mutual.  Sometime after 1987, the shopping centre was sold to the Deutschland Retail Property Trust Australia Ltd who sold 50% of the asset to the Westfield Group in 2002 and the remainder at a later time to the Australian property investment company, Dexus.  In July 2014, the Westfield Group was divided into two companies - the Scentre Group and the Westfield Corporation with the Scentre Group retaining the Westfield Group's interest in the shopping centre.

Upgrades 
2004-2006 saw a major expansion to the north of the centre; a large food court, fashion strip and a Reading Cinemas complex was built.

A large upgrade of the centre was completed in August 2013. It extended the centre further to the north-west, next to David Jones and Harris Scarfe and introduced a paid parking system. Target become an anchor tenant as well as approximately 40 additional retailers added.

References 

Westfield Group
Shopping centres in Adelaide
Shopping malls established in 1974
1974 establishments in Australia